Events from the year 1956 in South Korea.

Incumbents
President: Rhee Syng-man
Vice President: Ham Tae-young (until 14 August), Chang Myon (starting 15 August)

Events

Births
 10 April – Kwon Hee-deok, voice actress and writer (d. 2018)
 18 June - Yoo Dong-geun.
 1 December - Yim Tae-hee.

Deaths
 30 January - Kim Chang-ryong
 20 March - Park In-hwan, Korean poet
 5 May - Sin Ik-hui
 6 September - Lee Jung-seob, Korean painter

See also
List of South Korean films of 1956
Years in Japan
Years in North Korea

References

 
South Korea
Years of the 20th century in South Korea
1950s in South Korea
South Korea